Senator Peck may refer to:

Asahel Peck (1803–1879), Vermont State Senate
Bethuel Peck (1788–1862), New York State Senate
Ebenezer Peck (1805–1881), Illinois State Senate
Jacob Peck (1779–1869), Tennessee State Senate
Jedediah Peck (1748–1821), New York State Senate